Ophyx owgarra is a moth of the family Erebidae first described by George Thomas Bethune-Baker in 1906. It is found in Papua and Papua New Guinea. The habitat consists of mountainous areas.

References

Ophyx
Moths described in 1906
Moths of Papua New Guinea
Moths of Indonesia